Brostallicin is a chemical compound being studied in the treatment of cancer. It is an alkylating agent that binds DNA.

References 

Experimental cancer drugs
Pyrroles
Organobromides
Halogen-containing natural products
Guanidine alkaloids
Alkene derivatives
Carboxamides